Dennis Chukude Osadebay (29 June 1911 — 26 December 1994) was a Nigerian politician, poet, journalist and  former premier of the now defunct Mid-Western Region of Nigeria, which now comprises Edo and Delta State. He was one of the pioneering Nigerian poets who wrote in English.

As a politician, he detested party politics and tried to form unbiased opinions on important matters of the period. He was also a leader of the movement to create a Mid-Western region during the Nigerian First Republic.

Biography

Early life and poems
He was born in Asaba, Delta State, to parents of mixed cultural backgrounds. He attended Asaba Government School at Asaba, the Sacred Heart School in Calabar and Hope Waddell Training Institute. He joined the labour force in 1930 as a customs officer working in Lagos, Port Harcourt and Calabar. He subsequently went to England to study Law during the 1940s. It was while studying that he started publishing poetic verses. He was then known as a newspaper poet, as most of his writings were published in the West African Pilot and a few other newspapers. In his writings, Osadebay used both his personal life and public events as inspiration. In Africa Sings, a collection of poems, he delved with themes from a personal point of view, such as a sullen poem written about his 25th birthday and the coming of middle age. However, his best work in the volume were poems written from an impersonal viewpoint. In his adventurous poem "black man troubles", he used pidgin English to lament the status of black Africans in colonial Africa and injustice in the society. His poems were also notable for faithfully representing modern poetic rhythm.

Political career
Osadebay was one of the founding members of the National Council of Nigeria and the Cameroons (NCNC) in 1944. He left the country to read law a few years later. After, completing his studies, he returned to Nigeria and established a law practice in Aba and was also made the legal adviser of the NCNC. In 1951, he contested and won a seat on the Western Region House of Assembly, which was dominated by the rival Action Group (AG). He soon became the leader of opposition in the region from 1954 to 1956 but gave the mantle to Adegoke Adelabu in 1956. After the death of Adegoke Adelabu, he took on his familiar oppositional role in 1958. In 1960, he became the president of the Nigerian Senate and upon the creation of the Mid-Western Region in 1963, became the pioneer premier of the newly created region.

Premier

References

Nigerian male poets
Igbo lawyers
Igbo poets
Igbo politicians
1911 births
1994 deaths
National Council of Nigeria and the Cameroons politicians
Presidents of the Senate (Nigeria)
State governors of Nigeria
20th-century Nigerian poets
20th-century Nigerian lawyers
20th-century Nigerian politicians
Hope Waddell Institute alumni